is a wooden roller coaster at Kijima Kogen, an amusement park in Beppu, Ōita Prefecture, Japan.

Opening in 1992 (although other sources report that it opened in 1993), Jupiter was the first wooden roller coaster in Japan and the only wooden roller coaster in Japan until White Canyon opened at Yomiuriland amusement park and White Cyclone opened at Nagashima Spa Land amusement park (both in 1994).

History

Although Japan has had numerous notable roller coasters—including coasters that have held the record of world's longest, world's fastest, and world's tallest roller coaster—it has had relatively few wooden roller coasters. This resulted from Japanese earthquake engineering regulations that restricted the construction of tall wooden structures. It was not until after these restrictions were modified that Jupiter (and later White Canyon and White Cyclone) could be constructed.

Jupiter was built by Intamin out of Norway spruce lumber and it cost a total of 2.5 billion yen to construct. The coaster was also the last to be designed by noted roller coaster designer Curtis D. Summers before his death in 1992 and it was one of only two coasters that he produced with Intamin.

The roller coaster Jupiter is also notable for briefly appearing in the 1994 science fiction kaiju movie, Godzilla vs. SpaceGodzilla.

Ride experience and theme

While it is reported to be the most popular ride at Kijima Kogen, Jupiter is described by a number of sources as having a rough and somewhat uncomfortable ride experience. Single rides on Jupiter cost 1,000 yen.

Outside the ride is an example roller coaster train car, as well as a small "Jupiter" shrine in a Shinto motif.

References

Roller coasters in Japan